The European Volleyball Championship of the Small Countries Association is a biannual sport competition for men's, women's and junior national teams. It is recognized and fully supported by the European Volleyball Confederation (CEV) and organized by one of its zonal associations called CEV Small Countries Association (CEV SCA), formerly Small Countries Division (SCD). Only national federations of the 15 countries which are members of the CEV SCA are eligible to participate in the tournaments.

CEV SCA members

Results summary

Men

Medals summary

Women

Medals summary

Junior men

Medals summary

Junior women

Medals summary

References

External links
 CEV SCA Homepage
 CEV Homepage 

 
 
 

 
Small Countries
European volleyball records and statistics
Volleyball competitions in Europe
Biennial sporting events